Trifurcula zollikofferiela is a moth of the family Nepticulidae. It was described by Pierre Chrétien in 1914. It is known from Algeria.

The larvae feed on Launea nudicaulis.

References

Nepticulidae
Endemic fauna of Algeria
Moths described in 1914
Moths of Africa